WinCustomize is a website that provides content for users to customize Microsoft Windows. The site hosts thousands of skins, themes, icons, wallpapers, and other graphical content to modify the Windows graphical user interface.  There is some premium or paid content, however, the vast majority of the content is free for users to download.

Site history 
WinCustomize was launched in March 2001 by Brad Wardell and Pat Ford, both of whom work at Stardock. After the dot-com recession had taken down many popular skin sites, WinCustomize quickly grew in popularity due to a combination of wide variety of content, uptime reliability, and being the preferred content destination by Stardock customers.

The site has grown at a far greater pace than its founders had anticipated. It has managed to avoid having to put many limitations on users or having to resort to pop-up advertising because of its corporate patron Stardock subsidizing its costs. This growth has prompted several site redesigns to offer improved functionality and reliability to users.

Since launch, WinCustomize has undergone several iterations:

WinCustomize 2k5 — Launched at the end of 2004, WinCustomize was redesigned for improved stability, and added functionality, such as personal pages for subscribers, an articles system, tutorials etc.

WinCustomize 2k7 — Launched January 15, 2007, WC2k7 was a fundamental rewrite using ASP.NET. The focus was to build a foundation that was easier to maintain and, in the future, expand.

WinCustomize v6 — Planned for Late 2008/Early 2009, the WC v6 project aims be a major revision to how users navigate and interact with the site and the community as a whole. Where 2k7 was focused on the core codebase, v6 is focused on the user interface and experience.

In July 2007 the WinCustomize Wiki was launched.

WinCustomize 2010 — WinCustomize 2010 was launched on April 20, 2010. This major revision represents a major change in the sites look and navigation for users. A guided tour of the new site was published for users.

Popular skinning programs 
Programs heavily associated with Windows customization include:

WindowBlinds – enables users to customize the look and feel of the Windows GUI.
Winamp – A skinnable media player from Nullsoft.
IconPackager – A program that enables users to change their Windows icons.
Rainlendar — A skinnable calendar and small desktop application (widgets & monitoring) program.
DesktopX — A program that enables users to build their own desktop with objects and widgets.
Windows Media Player — Microsoft's skinnable media player.
LiteStep – A noted desktop shell replacement for Windows.
ObjectDock — provides a dock that adds functionality to the Windows interface, similar but not an emulation of the dock in Mac OS X.
LogonStudio — alters the Windows XP and Windows Vista welcome screen.
BootSkin — alters the Windows 2000 and Windows XP boot screen.

References

External links 

WinCustomize forums
WinCustomize Wiki

Digital art
Art websites
Online databases
Computing websites
Stardock software